Kevin Hwang (Hangul: 케빈황; born May 1, 1992), also known by his Korean name Hwang Ji-tu (Hangul: 황지투) and better known by his stage name G2 (Hangul: 지투), is a Korean-American rapper and singer. He released his debut album, G2's Life, on March 30, 2017. He has also appeared on Show Me the Money 5 and Tribe of Hip Hop.

Discography

Studio albums

Collaborative albums

Extended plays

Singles

Participation in Albums

References

External links
 

1992 births
Living people
South Korean male rappers
South Korean hip hop singers
21st-century South Korean  male singers